Taegesville is an unincorporated community located in the towns of Berlin and Maine, Marathon County, Wisconsin, United States.

References

Unincorporated communities in Marathon County, Wisconsin
Unincorporated communities in Wisconsin